Jack Lesberg (February 14, 1920 – September 17, 2005) was an American jazz double-bassist.

Lesberg performed with many famous jazz musicians, including Louis Armstrong, Earl Hines, Jack Teagarden, Sarah Vaughan and Benny Goodman, with whom he went on several international tours. He also performed in the New York City Symphony under Leonard Bernstein in the 1940s.

A native of Boston, Massachusetts, United States, Lesberg had the misfortune of playing in that city's Cocoanut Grove on the night in 1942 when 492 people lost their lives in a fire. His escape was memorialized by fellow bassist Charles Mingus in an unpublished section of Mingus's autobiography Beneath the Underdog; this passage was read by rapper Chuck D. on the Mingus tribute album, Weird Nightmare.

Lesberg continued to tour in the 1980s and was interviewed for KCEA radio in 1984, following a performance in Menlo Park, California.  During the taped interview he spoke of the many bands and performers he worked with and expressed his feelings that he felt blessed to be a musician.

He died of Alzheimer's in Englewood at the age of 85.

Discography
As co-leader
We've Got Rhythm/Live at Hanratty's (Chaz Jazz, 1981)
No Amps Allowed (Chiaroscuro)

As sideman
Dixieland Jazz (Waldorf, 1957)
Tribute to Louis Armstrong (Jugoton, 1985)
Tribute to Louis Armstrong Vol. 2 (Jugoton, 1989)
The Music of Lil Hardin Armstrong (Chiaroscuro, 1988)
With George Barnes
Guitar in Velvet (Grand Award, 1957)
Country Jazz (Colortone, 1957)
Movin' Easy (Mercury, 1959)
Guitar Galaxies (Mercury, 1960)
Guitars Galore (Mercury, 1961)
With Ruth Brown 
Ruth Brown (Atlantic, 1957) 
With Urbie Green
All About Urbie Green and His Big Band (ABC-Paramount, 1956)
With Coleman Hawkins
The Hawk in Hi Fi (RCA Victor, 1956)
With Johnny Hodges
Blue Rabbit (Verve, 1964) 
With the Henri René Orchestra
RCA Victor Presents Eartha Kitt (RCA, 1953)
That Bad Eartha (EP) (RCA, 1954)
Down To Eartha (RCA, 1955)
That Bad Eartha (LP) (RCA, 1956)
Thursday's Child (RCA, 1957)
With Eddie Condon 
In Japan (Chiaroscuro, 1964)
With Ralph Sutton & Ruby Braff 
R & R (Chiaroscuro, 1994)

References

External links
Jack Lesberg Interview NAMM Oral History Library (1984)

Jack Lesberg at Discogs

1920 births
2005 deaths
American jazz double-bassists
Male double-bassists
Dixieland jazz musicians
Mainstream jazz double-bassists
Musicians from Boston
20th-century American musicians
Jazz musicians from Massachusetts
20th-century double-bassists
20th-century American male musicians
American male jazz musicians